Burqa is a Palestinian town in the Ramallah and al-Bireh Governorate of the State of Palestine, located east of Ramallah in the northern West Bank. According to the Palestinian Central Bureau of Statistics (PCBS), the town had a population of approximately 2,090 inhabitants in the 2007 census.

Location
It is bordered by Deir Dibwan  to the east and north,  Beitin  to the north, Al-Bireh to the west, and Mukhmas and Kafr 'Aqab to the south.

History
In 1596, Burqa appeared in Ottoman tax registers as being in the Nahiya of Quds of the Liwa of Quds.  It had a population of 28 Muslim households. The villagers paid a fixed tax rate of 33,3% on various agricultural products, including wheat, barley, olives, fruit trees, goats and/or beehives; a total of  4,940  akçe.

In 1838 Edward Robinson noted it as a Muslim village, Burka, located in the area immediately north of Jerusalem,  seeing it "high up on the hill-side".

In 1863 Victor Guérin  found it to contain about thirty houses. A Muslim shrine devoted to Sheikh Youseph was also noted.

An Ottoman village list from about 1870 showed that Burka had a population of 152, with a total of 31 houses, though the population count included men, only. In 1883, the PEF's Survey of Western Palestine described Burkah as "a good-sized village standing high on a bare hillside, with a spring in the valley to the south."

In 1896 the population of Burka was estimated to be about 270 people.

British  Mandate of Palestine
In the 1922 census of Palestine, conducted by the British Mandate authorities, Burqa had a population of 268, all Muslims, increasing in the 1931 census, to 320, still all Muslim, in 66  houses.

In the 1945 statistics, the population was 380, all  Muslims, while the total land area was 6,001 dunams, according to an official land and population survey. Of this, 1,297 dunams were allocated for plantations and irrigable land, 2,460 for cereals, while 22 dunams were classified as built-up areas.

Jordanian era
In the wake of the 1948 Arab–Israeli War, and after the 1949 Armistice Agreements, Burqa came under Jordanian rule.

The Jordanian census of 1961 found 582 inhabitants.

1967 and aftermath
Since the Six-Day War in 1967,  Burqa has been under Israeli occupation.

After the 1995 accords, 8.5% of the village land was defined as Area B land,  while the remaining 91.5% was defined as Area C. Israel has confiscated land from Burqa for the construction of the Israeli settlement of Kokhav Ya'akov.

The outpost Migron, Mateh Binyamin was located east of Burqa, on land registered as privately owned by inhabitants of Burqa and Deir Dibwan. In 2012 Migron was evacuated and since then the area is deserted.

Footnotes

Bibliography

External links
Welcome To Burqa
Survey of Western Palestine, Map 17:  IAA, Wikimedia commons 
    Burqa Village (fact sheet), Applied Research Institute–Jerusalem (ARIJ)
    Burqa Village profile, ARIJ
   Burqa - aerial photo, ARIJ
 Locality Development Priorities and Needs in Burqa Village, ARIJ
   The Delusion of evacuating Migron Outpost, 15, October, 2008, POICA
  Israeli Colonists Uproot Olive Trees in Burqa – Ramallah Governorate 14, May, 2011,  POICA
  Colonists Use Fraud to Capture Lands 05, July, 2012, POICA
  Me'ron colonists destroy 31 olive trees in Burqa Village,  07/02/2014, POICA
 Unipal: Burqa  

Villages in the West Bank
Ramallah and al-Bireh Governorate
Municipalities of the State of Palestine